Parachanna is a genus of snakeheads native to freshwater habitats in tropical Africa. Three recognized extant (living) species are in this genus, but a phylogenetic study from 2017 indicates that a fourth, currently undescribed species also exists.

One fossil species, Parachanna fayumensis Murray, 2006 dated to the Upper Eocene and Lower Oligocene is known from the Jebel Qatrani Formation of the Fayum Depression, Egypt.

Species
The three recognized extant species in this genus are:
 Parachanna africana (Steindachner, 1879) (African snakehead)
 Parachanna insignis (Sauvage, 1884) (brown snakehead)
 Parachanna obscura (Günther, 1861) (obscure snakehead)

References
 

 
Freshwater fish genera
Taxa named by Jacques Daget